Göran Breisner (born 1 July 1954) is a Swedish equestrian. He competed in two events at the 1984 Summer Olympics.

References

External links
 

1954 births
Living people
Swedish male equestrians
Olympic equestrians of Sweden
Equestrians at the 1984 Summer Olympics
Sportspeople from Malmö
20th-century Swedish people